Shaukat Ali Yousafzai is a Pakistani politician who had been a member of the Provincial Assembly of Khyber Pakhtunkhwa from October 2018 till January 2023. He also served as a member of the 10th Provincial Assembly of Khyber Pakhtunkhwa, representing the Pakistan Tehreek-e-Insaf (PTI) and as Minister for Health and Information Khyber Pakhtunkhwa in the Pervez Khattak administration. He also serves as the Secretary General of PTI’s provincial chapter of Khyber Pakhtunkhwa and previously has served as the political advisor to Imran Khan.

Background
Yousafzai is a senior journalist and a senior leader of Pakistan Tehreek-e-Insaf. He remained the president of Khyber Union of Journalist for three times. He is a Chief Editor of Daily Surkhab which is published from Peshawar. He basically belongs to Besham a remote village of District Shangla, and settled in Peshawar since 90s. He is a member and Deputy Parliamentary Leader of Provincial Assembly KPK.Currently he is holding no Ministry in Khyber Pukhtunkhwa.

Education
He obtained his early education from Government High School Shang District Shangla and then his Intermediate from Jehanzeb College Swat. He has done MSc from KPK Agricultural University Peshawar. He has also obtained a Journalism degree from University of Peshawar.

Journalism
He remained an active journalist throughout his career and worked from different news papers. He also hosted talk shows on PTV and AVT Khyber.
He is the Chief editor of Daily Surkhab which is published from Peshawar.
He remained the president of Khyber Union of Journalist for three consecutive times.
During his tenure, he worked a lot for welfare of Journalist. He earns a respectable name in society.

Political career
Shoaukat Ali Yousafzai remained active in politics during his university and was the President of People Student Federation of KPK Agricultural University Peshawar.
He joined Pakistan Tehreek-e-Insaf in 1996 and also contested election from District Shangla. Since from that time, he remained active in politics and given his efforts for establishing PTI in KPK.
In 2011 he was appointed as Political Advisor to chairman Imran khan. He then resigned from this post to contest intra party election. He was elected as Provincial General Secretary of Pakistan Tehreek-e-Insaf in KPK. 
In 2013 General elections, he contested for Provincial Assembly seats from PK-2 Peshawar and got a huge victory against Syed Zahir Ali Shah of Pakistan People Party with a margin of 16000 votes.
PTI has assigned Shaukat Ali Yousafzai as Deputy Parliamentary Leader in KPK Provincial Assembly. He is also serving as Minister for Health and Information Khyber Pukhtunkhwa. He is the most influential Provincial leader of Khyber Pukhtunkhwa province. He got worldwide recognition following a June 14, 2019 conference when he was accidentally equipped with a cat face filter by a social media team volunteer.

References

External links 
 PTI OFFICIAL WEBSITE

Pakistan Tehreek-e-Insaf politicians
Pashtun people
Pakistani male journalists
Khyber Pakhtunkhwa MPAs 2013–2018
People from Shangla District
People from Peshawar
1963 births
Living people